The Pondicherry women's cricket team, also known as Puducherry women's cricket team, is a women's cricket team that represents the Indian union territory of Puducherry. They were formed ahead of the 2018–19 season, and compete in the Women's Senior One Day Trophy and the Senior Women's T20 League.

History
Pondicherry Women were formed ahead of the 2018–19 season, after an expansion of teams in Indian domestic cricket. In their first season, they competed in the Senior Women's One Day League, finishing 2nd in the Plate competition, and in the Senior Women's T20 League, finishing 7th out of 8 in their group.

The following season, 2019–20, Pondicherry finished 5th in the Plate competition of the Senior Women's One Day League and 6th in their Senior Women's T20 League group. The following season, 2020–21, with only the One Day League going ahead, Pondicherry finished 2nd in the Plate competition, with 5 wins from their six games, gaining promotion to the Elite Group. Pondicherry bowler Amruta Saran was the joint-second highest wicket-taker across the whole competition, with 16 wickets at an average of 11.43. In 2021–22, they failed to qualify for the knockout stages of the Plate Group in both competitions. In 2022–23, the side finished 5th in their group in both competitions.

Players

Notable players
Players who have played for Pondicherry and played internationally are listed below, in order of first international appearance (given in brackets):

 Karu Jain (2004)
 Gouher Sultana (2008)
 Anagha Deshpande (2008)
 Latika Kumari (2009)

Seasons

Women's Senior One Day Trophy

Senior Women's T20 League

See also
 Pondicherry cricket team

References

Women's cricket teams in India
Cricket in Puducherry
Cricket clubs established in 2018
2018 establishments in Puducherry